Alia's Birth is a 2021 independent drama film by Sam Abbas starring Poorna Jagannathan, Nikohl Boosheri, Maya Kazan, and Samuel H. Levine.

Cast
 Poorna Jagannathan as Jaime
 Nikohl Boosheri as Tess
 Maya Kazan as Jenna
 Samuel H. Levine as Shadi
 Edward Akrout as Tom

Production
In April 2019, it was announced Poorna Jagannathan, Nikohl Boosheri, were cast for Alia's Birth, with Sam Abbas directing the film.
Tatiana Bears, Nicole Townsend and Abbas were producing, with Sig De Miguel and Stephen Vincent co-producing.
Shortly after the rest of the cast was released.

Abbas released exclusively via The Hollywood Reporter a contest for female-filmmakers to submit their short works to be included in Alia's Birth. The response was tremendous, with hundreds of submissions He quoted, "While I can't talk much about the narrative, the importance of this short piece being female-directed is crucial, Alia's Birth is female-led, from the acting to behind the camera. I find it easier to communicate and collaborate when working with women. I grew up surrounded by amazing women, and my favorite films are led by women." Abbas also mentioned that the winner of the short film contest was filmmaker Sindha Agha.

Release
In May 2020, The Hollywood Reporter released a first-look of the feature with major information. The film was shortlisted for the 2020 Cannes Film festival before the festival was cancelled because of the COVID-19 pandemic. Abbas made it clear that the film was for theatrical viewings only. It would never have a life outside of theatres; no DVD/Blu-ray/VOD release. The film premiered on 26 August 2021.

Reception
The Guardian was the first to review saying "the sudden onrush of biological imperative gives this footage a gripping undeniability and focus that this loosely collaged account of a foundering Brooklyn relationship has been searching for".

References

External links
 
 Profile on Mubi (streaming service)

2021 films
2021 drama films
2021 independent films
American independent films
American drama films
Films set in New York City
Films shot in New York City
2020s English-language films
2020s American films